Ocfentanil (INN; also called A-3217) is a potent synthetic opioid structurally related to fentanyl that was developed in the early 1990s as one of a series of potent naloxone-reversible opioids in an attempt to obtain an opioid that had better therapeutic indices in terms of cardiovascular effects and respiratory depression as compared to fentanyl. Ocfentanil was never developed for medical use despite reasonable results in human clinical trials, but subsequently started to be sold as a designer drug starting in around 2013.

Study of the analgesic activity of ocfentanil using the mouse hot plate test (55 °C) gave an ED50 of 0.007 mg/kg compared to 0.018 mg/kg for fentanyl; ocfentanil being approximately 2.5 times as potent as fentanyl in this test.

In human volunteers ocfentanil induces effective analgesia at 1 μg/kg, while in doses up to 3 μg/kg, analgesia and respiratory depression occurred in a dose-dependent manner. While a further study suggests that ocfentanil may be as effective as morphine in post-operative relief, Ocfentanil was also studied as a supplement to general anaesthesia, in which the researchers concluded that it appears to be similar in action to fentanyl, with 3 μg/kg of ocfentanil approximately equivalent to 5 μg/kg of fentanyl.

Side effects of fentanyl analogs are similar to those of fentanyl itself, which include itching, nausea and potentially serious respiratory depression, which can be life-threatening. Fentanyl analogs have killed hundreds of people throughout Europe and the former Soviet republics since the most recent resurgence in use began in Estonia in the early 2000s, and novel derivatives continue to appear.

Legal status

As of October 2015 Ocfentanil is a controlled substance in China.

Ocfentanil is a Schedule I controlled drug in the USA since 1. February 2018.

References 

Synthetic opioids
Piperidines
Ethers
Acetanilides
Fluoroarenes
Mu-opioid receptor agonists